Chionodes emptor is a moth in the family Gelechiidae. It is found in North America, where it has been recorded from South Carolina to Florida and Texas.

References

Chionodes
Moths described in 1999
Moths of North America